Walter "Wattie" Wilson (4 November 1879 – 1926) was a Scottish footballer who played in the English Football League for Lincoln City.

References

1879 births
1926 deaths
Scottish footballers
Lincoln City F.C. players
English Football League players
People from Armadale, West Lothian
Association football defenders